The Yuin nation, also spelt Djuwin, is a group of Australian Aboriginal peoples from the South Coast of New South Wales. All Yuin people share ancestors who spoke, as their first language, one or more of the Yuin language dialects. Sub-groupings of the Yuin people are made on the basis of language and other cultural features; groups include the Brinja or Brinja-Yuin,  Budawang, Murramarang,  Yuin-Monaro, Djiringanj, Walbunja, and more. They had a close association with the Thaua people.

Name and identity
The ethnonym Yuin ("man") was selected by early Australian ethnographer, Alfred Howitt, to denote two distinct tribes of News South Wales, namely the Djiringanj and the Thaua. In Howitt's work, the Yuin were divided into northern (Kurial-Yuin) and southern (Gyangal-Yuin) branches.

The term "Yuin" is commonly used by South Coast Aboriginal people to describe themselves, although in a 2016 New South Wales native title application for land overlapping Yuin country, "South Coast people" is used. The name is also spelt Djuwin and Juwin.

The native title application depends on establishing the South Coast Aboriginal people as a distinct and continuing group that has existed since colonisation. South Coast Aboriginal people have identified 59 apical ancestors that lived during the settlement of the region in 1810–1830; current South Coast Aboriginal people are either descended from these ancestors or integrated into families that descend from these ancestors.

In 2018, the National Native Title Tribunal ruled that the South Coast people represent a "single cohesive kinship population" going back to colonisation, governed by shared rules, with a "single system of religion" centred on the figure Darhumulan, a marine-based economy, sacred sites that continue to be recognised, exogamous marriage rules, and a male initiation ceremony called Bunan (remembered, but not practised since the 1920s).

Language

Dialects of the Yuin language group include the Djiringanj, Thaua,  Walbanga, Wandandian and Dhurga languages, from north of Moruya River to Nowra.

Country 

The country the Yuin ancestors occupied, used, and enjoyed reached across from Cape Howe to the Shoalhaven River and inland to the Great Dividing Range. Their descendants claim rights to be recognised as the traditional owners of the land and water from Merimbula to the southern head of the sea entrance of the Shoalhaven River. The Yuin people consisted of 12 clans at the time of European arrival in the area.

The Yuin groups include:

 Walbanga, or Walbunja, north of present-day Moruya River
 Murramurang, north of Deua River to south of Lake Conjola
 Dyiringanj, or Djiringanj, from Corunna Lake, south to Bega and west to the top of the range 
Brinja from South Kianga to Moruya River.
Budawang
Murramarang
Yuin-Monaro

The Yuin are set out as follows by Howitt (1904):
 Guyangal Yuin (South-Yuin)

              (1) Thauaira, east of Mallacoota Inlet.

              (2) Tadera-manji,- in the Bega district.

              (3) Bugelli-manji, in the Moruya district

 Kurial-Yuin (North-Yuin)

              (4) Name not ascertained, in the Braidwood district.

              (5) Name not ascertained, in the Ulladulla district.

              (6) Gurungatta-manji, in the Lower Shoalhaven River district.

Contemporary sources report that the Brinja-Yuin people's traditional lands extended along the "Lagoon Coast", south of the Moruya River to South Kianga, or further south to the Wagonga Inlet at Narooma. The Bugelli-manji people lived around Moruya.

During the push in the late 1970s and early 1980s to protect Mumbulla Mountain, Wallaga Lake people led by Guboo Ted Thomas described the Yuin tribe as "shar[ing] the one walkabout from Mallacoota in the south to the Shoalhaven River in the north".

In 2016, 12 applicants representing South Coast Aboriginals lodged a native title claim in the Federal Court for Yuin country in New South Wales. The claim is made by 52 family groups and was approved by more than 500 Aboriginal people. The claim extends into the ocean and includes traditional fishing rights. In 2018, the registration was accepted.

History 
The population before 1788 has been estimated at about 11,000 between Cape Howe and Batemans Bay.  The population was reduced to only 600 by the mid nineteenth century due to smallpox epidemics in 1789 and 1830, as well as tribal battles and the spread of venereal disease from whalers.

The Eurobodalla Shire Council signed a Local Agreement with the Northern Yuin people in 1998.  In 2001, a Memorandum of Understanding was signed between the Bega, Eden and Merrimans Local Aboriginal Land Councils, the Native Title Holders and the Bega Valley Shire Council.

The Yuin at Twofold Bay near Eden had mutual cooperation with the killer whales of Eden.

Strict laws, regulations, and lore  
The Yuin were closely tied together they had a number of ceremonies including Bunneye Ceremony, keeparra ceremony, ngarra washing ceremony and many more.

The Bunneye ceremony was a fairly important occasion an important elder would be allocate the responsibility to manage and control a Bunneye ceremony. if you're going to use the analogy to day this important elder had judicial oversight to make and control laws. This elder maybe a king or a serious warrior and having judicial oversight meant that he had to make sure this important lore ceremony was carried out to the letter of the law. Different musical instruments we used for different occasions. The Bar-ro-wa ... a large bullroarer was used in the keeparra ceremony.  The ngarra was a cleansing and washing ceremony.

The Djiringanj, Brinja and Walbunja tribes lived under very strict laws and regulations and lore's as we would turn them today, it was for the control and betterment of society and for the management of their allodium type lands. Land could not be traded or given away when a person moved from one tribe to another such as a woman being given in marriage. The land was a heritable possession not necessarily for the most important person in the tribe but for the whole tribe and along with that went all the laws and regulations. An important point to remember here, a woman retained where she came from, she had to adopt the new tribe when married and all its lore's and laws and regulations, all her children would belong to the new tribe, but she retained where she originally was born

Places 

The Yuin are considered as the traditional owners of Wallaga Lake land. The former Wallaga Lake National Park is incorporated into Gulaga National Park. Gulaga Mountain, in the Gulaga National Park, is described by Aboriginal people as the place of ancestral origin for Yuin people. Gulaga itself symbolises the mother, and has several sacred sites relating to places where the women went for storytelling and to participate in ceremonies and to give birth.

Umbarra, aka Merriman Island, in Wallaga Lake is a particularly sacred place for the Yuin people. On 25 November 1977, it was the first place in New South Wales to be declared an Aboriginal Heritage site by the New South Wales National Parks and Wildlife Service (NPWS).  The island was named after Umbarra, aka King Merriman, leader of the Yuin, who died in 1904. His wife was Queen Narelle.

Mumbulla Mountain, located in the middle of Bega Valley Shire, was named after "King" Jack Mumbulla, a leader of the Yuin people. Mumbulla Mountain is the central place of significance in Biamanga National Park, and is known for its importance in men's initiation ceremonies.

On 6 May 2006 the freehold titles to Gulaga and Biamanga National Parks were handed back to the Yuin people by the New South Wales Government. Freehold title of Gulaga National Park are held in trust for the Aboriginal owners by Merrimans and Wagonga Local Aboriginal Land Councils, while that of Biamanga are held in trust by Merrimans and Bega Local Aboriginal Land Councils. Both parks are co-managed by the traditional owners and the NPWS. 

Barunguba / Montague Island (dual-named in November 2021) is known to the Yuin people as Barunguba (sometimes spelt Barranguba).  Barunguba is regarded as being the son of Gulaga, along with Najanuga; Barunguba being the oldest son and allowed out to sea, whereas Najanuga had to stay close to his mother.

Kinship and marriage 
The exact arrangement of Yuin kinship before colonisation is not clear, although early ethnographers reported that they did not have a moiety or section system (where a people are split into two or four intermarrying groups). Instead, Yuin kinship would have involved "extensive networks of relatedness within and between exogamous intermarrying country groups".

Marriage should be exogamous between family groups, as determined by the spiritual connections of those families. However, these family connections are no longer a "a strong element" of contemporary Yuin kinship. To the extent that they are known, family spiritual connections are inherited, and there are still some Yuin families associated with certain animals. Yuin typically do not marry people with connections to the same personal or family beings (see below, Relationship with the natural world).

Skin groups 
Multiple Yuin have described a system of "skin groups" (subsets of language groups) that would "govern social behaviours and interaction, determining those with whom individuals can (and cannot) talk, marry, trade, as well as identifying their natural enemies". However, most Yuin these days are "not familiar with this level of the system".

Relationship with the natural world 
Yuin people had, and in many cases still have, spiritual, mutual relationships with an aspect of the natural world. These spiritual connections are represented by animals, and these connections come with obligations and relationships, not just to the animal but to other humans and to places and things associated with that animal.

Anthropologist Alfred William Howitt briefly described Yuin spiritual connections with animals in 1904, in The native tribes of south-east Australia. Howitt, and other early ethnographers, used the Ojibwe term "totem" to describe these spiritual connections, as they saw commonalities between Aboriginal Australian spiritual connections to animals and those of First Nations and Native Americans. The term is not widely used by Yuin and the term "totemism" is not well-regarded by them, but Yuin authors often use the term "totem" in works for wider audiences.

Yuin believe these spiritual animals to have been made in the Dreamtime by an ancestral creator, although not all spiritual animals have Dreamtime stories associated with them (or those stories have been lost). Dreamtime stories for the creation of the diving birds and the black swan are recorded by Susan Dale Donaldson.

The best known Yuin spiritual animals are the Pacific black duck (Umbarra) and the Black swan. The Black Duck was the moojingarl of King Merriman, who is named Umbarra after it, and a duck-shaped island in Wallaga Lake is named Merriman Island. Umbarra was believed to communicate with black ducks, who would warn him of danger.

In 2003, Rose, James and Watson identified six levels of "interacting beings" spoken of by the Yuin, also described as "families within families" by Yuin woman Mary Duroux. The six families described (and, in brackets, the alternative terms used by Yuin elder Randall Mumbler) are:

 Beings interacting with the Yuin nation ("tribal totem")
 Beings interacting with tribes or named groups (N/A);
 Beings interacting with families (operating like clans) ("family totem");
 Beings interacting with skin groups (N/A);
 Initiation totems and names ("ceremonial totem");
 Beings interacting with specific individuals ("personal totem"; also called "individual totem" or moojingarl in other sources).

A Yuin's responsibilities to these beings, and their responsibilities to that Yuin, varied depending on the level of the relationship. For example, while a Yuin is expected to protect animals of their moojingarl, Guboo Ted Thomas described no obligation to protect the black duck as his relationship with it was only on a "nation" level.

Donaldson also briefly mentions "gender totems".

Some animals, including the Black Duck, can have spiritual connections with Yuin at any of these levels. Yuin typically do not eat animals with which they have a spiritual connection, which are considered part of their extended family – restrictions which may extend to related animals (all ducks, for example, because of the Black Duck connection).

Yuin elder Randall Mumbler describes the significance of the different levels of connection:

Susan Dale Donaldson has assembled a preliminary list of Yuin spiritual connections, consisting of 20 birds, two marine animals (bream and whale), seven terrestrial mammals and three reptiles.

Specific animals 
The black duck is the symbol for the Yuin people, and may be particularly significant for Yuin who may not have a moojingarl or do not know their family's spiritual connection due to dispossession and assimilation. Yuin have a spiritual connection (but not a "totem" one) with Mount Gulaga, believed to be the origin of the Yuin. From Gulaga, Merriman Island is visibly duck-shaped.

Genealogist and researcher Dave Tout, a relative of King Merriman, has identified at least four groups and their spiritual connection:

 Wadthi-Wadthi (northern group): Lyrebird
 Wadthi-Wadthi (southern group): Spotted owl
 Yeerimbine (south of Twofold Bay): Killer whale
 Wandian (Mount Sassafrass): Eagle

Beings interacting with families 
In 1904, the ethnologist Howitt described Yuin "totems" as patrilineal (i.e. inherited from the father), and gave budjan, mura and jimbir as Yuin terms for these "totems". Errors in Howitt's account that have been identified by contemporary Yuin include his use of budjan for "totem" (it just means "bird") and that inheritance was only patrilineal, as there is also matrilineal inheritance of family connections.

There are still some Yuin families associated with certain animals. Many family connections are with birds – in which case they may be called "family birds".

Initiation totems and names 
Howitt described a "medicine man" bestowing a "second totem" (additional to a family "totem") on a Yuin man at his initiation. Contemporary Yuin describe the process as a "discussion" between elder and initiand about which animal is personally significant, rather than a bestowal, and variously describe the spiritual connection as a "secret" or "ceremonial" one, or as a "personal" one.

Donaldson says that ceremonial connections are earned by Yuin who "attain a certain ritual status". Many ceremonial relationships are with fish. Ceremonial connections are associated to the "specialised powers" that "clever people" have, such as Umbarra's power to turn into a whirlwind.

Yuin women may receive up to four new names during their spiritual training. The first two level names are open but the third and fourth are secret. However, unlike other kinship relationships described here, the names are not those of animals; examples include plant names, sacred place names, spirit women names and the word for "female warrior".

Beings interacting with individuals 
Yuin typically do not marry people with connections to the same personal or family beings.

A moojingarl is believed to "appear" unexpectedly, with its behaviour variously indicating approval, that all is well or that danger approaches. A person's "spirit" is expected to return to their moojingarl, so the appearance of a dolphin may remind viewers of a relative whose moojingarl was the dolphin. A moojingarl is believed to reveal itself to a Yuin person, rather than be chosen for them.

King Merriman described to Howitt that his black duck budjan ("bird", translated by Howitt as "totem") resided in his breast, and that if it were killed, Merriman would die as well. Merriman describes an attack by a person of the lace-lizard "totem", who sent a lace-lizard to crawl down Merriman's throat; it almost managed to eat the budjan in his breast.

Yuin elder Harrison says that your "personal totem" is "whatever comes near you when you are born".

Spiritual beliefs

Messenger birds 
Some Yuin believe in "messenger birds" or "mail birds", who are believed to communicate with their calls. Mopokes calling from a particular direction indicate that people are approaching from a particular direction (if they sing "fast and happy") or that a death occurred in the direction from which they are coming (if they call while slowly approaching from a distance). Willie wagtails deliver bad news, like the death of a loved one, and swans flying north indicate approaching storms. Yuin woman Eileen Morgan identifies four messenger birds (curlews, mail-birds, black ducks and owls), but also two mammals (black dogs and black wallabies).

When angered, "wind birds" (perhaps whip birds) are believed to make the west wind blow by whistling.

Dulagal 

Some Yuin believe in dulagal (also rendered doolagarl) or "hairy man", a powerful being that lives on Mount Gulaga or in the bush between Bermagui and Mumbulla, but travels down to the coast. Guboo Ted Thomas describes him as having red eyes, no neck and a long forehead, and walking "from side to side". Yuin children were warned not to stray from the campsite for fear of dulagal, and he was said to be able to draw people to him or put them to sleep, and to imitate bird sounds. People could escape dulagal by burning green bush leaves. Yuin woman Eileen Morgan (and a sister of Thomas) associates dulagal with the yowie, although that particular term was not used by the Yuin.

Notable Yuin

King Paddy Nurrang, King of Bergalia or Baragalia(?), of the Brinja people
 Umbarra (died 1904), aka King Merriman, leader of the Djiringanj for many years from the late 1800s 
Queen Narelle (or Nerelle), wife of Umbarra
 Biamanga (died 1919), aka King Jack Mumbulla, also written Mumbler and Mumbla, and also referred to as John Biamanga Mumbler, elder and leader after whom Mumbulla Mountain and Biamanga National Park are named. In 1912 white authorities declared him king of the Wallaga Lake tribe, and gave him a brass breast-plate. Biamanga was the son of an Aboriginal man with the surname Mumbler/Mumbla and Elizabeth Mumbla Turner, and married Rose Gunaal (Gunnal)) Carpenter (1880–1971). Biamanga took over the leadership of the Wallaga Lake clan from Umbarra (see below). 
Percy Mumbler (1907–1991), son of Biamanga and Rose, elder and land rights activist

 Edwin "Guboo" Ted Thomas (1909–2002)

 Jimmy Little (1937–2012), on his father's side

Notes

Citations

Sources

External links 
 AusAnthrop Australian Aboriginal tribal database entry for Thaua (aka Thurga, aka Yuin) 
 Tindale, Norman (1974) "Djiringanj" (dialect of Yuin) in his Catalogue of Australian Aboriginal Tribes. South Australian Museum. 
 Portion of Norman Tindale's (1974) Tribal Boundary Map including Djiringanj, Thaua, Walbanga, & Wandandian 

Aboriginal peoples of New South Wales
Extinct languages of New South Wales
South Coast (New South Wales)
Yuin–Kuric languages